Dissent is an American Left intellectual magazine edited by Natasha Lewis and Timothy Shenk and founded in 1954. The magazine is published by the University of Pennsylvania Press on behalf of the Foundation for the Study of Independent Social Ideas. Former co-editors include Irving Howe, Mitchell Cohen, Michael Walzer, and David Marcus.

History
The magazine was established in 1954 by a group of New York Intellectuals, which included Lewis A. Coser, Rose Laub Coser, Irving Howe, Norman Mailer, Henry Pachter, and Meyer Schapiro. Its co-founder and publisher for its first 15 years was University Place Book Shop owner Walter Goldwater.

From its inception, Dissents politics deviated from the standard ideological positions of the left and right. Like politics, the New Left Review and the French socialist magazine Socialisme ou Barbarie, Dissent sought to formulate a third position between the liberalism of the West and the communism of the East. Troubled by the rampant bureaucratization of both capitalist and communist society, Dissent was home to writers like C. Wright Mills and Paul Goodman who identified themselves as radical democrats as well as to editors who like Irving Howe and Michael Harrington more closely identified with democratic socialism. Over its seven decades in publication, it has also become an influential venue for social and cultural criticism, publishing political philosophers including Michael Walzer, Cornel West, and Iris Marion Young, as well as novelists and poets such as Günter Grass and Czesław Miłosz.

In the 1960s and 1970s, Dissents skepticism toward Third World revolutions and the culture of the New Left occasionally isolated it from student movements, but its commitment to both pluralist and egalitarian politics—in particular, when it came to social and civil rights issues—separated it from both the mainstream liberalism and the growing neoconservative movement. Although Dissent still identifies with the democratic socialism of its founders, including Lewis A. Coser and Rose Laub Coser, its editors and contributors represent a broad spectrum of left positions: from the Marxist humanism of Marshall Berman and Leszek Kołakowski, to the social democratic revisionism of Richard Rorty and Michael Walzer, and to the radical feminism of Ellen Willis and Seyla Benhabib. In the 2010s, several of its younger editors identified themselves with the heterodox Marxism and visions of radical democracy espoused by Occupy Wall Street.

Together with the Brooklyn Institute for Social Research, Dissent announced its Archive project. It will be digitizing several short-lived literary magazines, including Marxist Perspectives and democracy, and providing access to them online. It also recently launched a labor podcast and introduced a new front of the book section dedicated to publishing cultural criticism.

See also 
 Know Your Enemy — political podcast about the American conservative movement from a socialist perspective

References

Further reading
 George Packer, "A Modest Utopia: Sixty Years of Dissent", New Yorker, October 21, 2013.
Felicia R. Lee, "A Leftist Stalwart, Still Fighting the Fight", The New York Times, February 21, 2004.
 
 Jennifer Schuessler, "A Lion of the Left Wing Celebrates Six Decades", The New York Times, October 27, 2013.

External links 
 
 Dissent at the University of Pennsylvania Press

1954 establishments in New York City
Political magazines published in the United States
Quarterly magazines published in the United States
English-language magazines
Magazines established in 1954
Magazines published in Philadelphia
New Left
Socialism in the United States
Socialist magazines
University of Pennsylvania Press
University of Pennsylvania Press academic journals